Moritz Hauptmann (13 October 1792, Dresden – 3 January 1868, Leipzig), was a German music theorist, teacher and composer. His principal theoretical work is the 1853 Die Natur der Harmonie und der Metrik explores numerous topics, particular the philosophy of music.

Biography
Hauptmann was born in Dresden, and studied violin under Scholz, piano under Franz Lanska, composition under Grosse and Francesco Morlacchi (the rival of Carl Maria von Weber). He completed his education as a violinist and composer under Louis Spohr, and until 1821 held various appointments in private families. In addition, he studied mathematics and acoustics.

Hauptmann was initially employed as an architect before finding success as a musician. Notable in his early musical output is a grand tragic opera, Mathilde. He joined the orchestra of Kassel in 1822 under Spohr's direction. There, he first taught composition and music theory. His pupils included Ferdinand David, Friedrich Burgmüller, Friedrich Kiel, Ernst Naumann, Oscar Paul, Isidor Seiss and others.

In 1842, Hauptmann became Kantor of the Thomanerchor at St. Thomas Church, Leipzig (a post made famous by Johann Sebastian Bach) as well as professor of music theory at the newly founded conservatoire at the invitation of Felix Mendelssohn. In this capacity, his unique gift as a teacher developed and it was readily acknowledged by his enthusiastic and quite-often distinguished pupils.

Compositions
Hauptmann's compositions are marked by symmetry and craftsmanship rather than spontaneous invention. His vocal output includes two masses, choral songs for mixed voices (Op. 32, 47) and numerous part songs.

Literary work
He was a founding member and editor of the Bach Gesellschaft edition of the complete works of Bach, where he edited the first two volumes of church cantatas and the Lutheran Masses.

His musical philosophy is embodied in his book Die Natur der Harmonie und der Metrik (The Nature of Harmony and Meter, 1853), in which he attempted a philosophic explanation of musical form. His theory is described as "Hegelian" and he emphasized concepts of unity, opposition, and reunion, which he finds in chords, scales, key relationships, and meter. He conceived of minor and major triads as opposite. This theory influenced "harmonic dualists" including Hugo Riemann. He also advocated just intonation and considered enharmonic progressions unnatural. In this sense, he could be considered a conservative in relation to the compositional trends of his time. He displayed a taste for classical proportion, formal order, metrical clarity, and tonal logic. Unlike the Romantic trends of continuous legato, he considered any "metrical first" (i.e. downbeat – implied or actual) to be automatically accented.

Hauptmann's pupils

Notes

References
 Moritz Hauptmann: The Letters of a Leipzig Cantor (2 vols.). London: Novello, Ewer and Co., 1892.
 Moritz Hauptmann: The nature of harmony and metre. New York: Da Capo Press, 1991, Reprint of the ed. London, Sonnenschein, 1893. .
 Dale A. Jorgenson: Moritz Hauptmann of Leipzig. Studies in History and Interpretation of Music, Vol. 2.  Lewiston, NY: The Edwin Mellen Press, 1986. 
 William Mason: Memories of a Musical Life. New York: The Century Company, 1902.
Attribution

External links

1792 births
1868 deaths
German composers
German music theorists
Bach musicians
Bach scholars
Honorary Members of the Royal Philharmonic Society
Musicians from Dresden
Musicians from Leipzig
Thomaskantors
Academic staff of the University of Music and Theatre Leipzig
19th-century German musicologists